John Oswald Spuhler (18 September 1917 –  7 January 2007) was an English professional footballer.

References 
 
 

1917 births
2007 deaths
Footballers from Sunderland
Association football forwards
English footballers
Sunderland A.F.C. players
Middlesbrough F.C. players
Darlington F.C. players
Spennymoor United F.C. players
English football managers
Spennymoor United F.C. managers
Shrewsbury Town F.C. managers